Signed, Sealed, Delivered (original title: Dead Letters), also known as Lost Letter Mysteries, is an American-Canadian drama/romantic comedy television series that aired on the Hallmark Channel from April 20 through June 22, 2014. Created by Touched by an Angels Martha Williamson, Signed, Sealed, Delivered focuses on four postal workers who take it upon themselves to track down intended recipients of undeliverable mail. Similarly to her previous program, the show promotes Williamson's Christian beliefs as the characters struggle with their faith while relying on divine intervention to accomplish their task. It is set in Denver, Colorado but filmed mostly in the Vancouver area. On October 12, 2013, a two-hour pilot movie aired on Hallmark and was a ratings success. It was the number-one television movie on its airdate and the number-two movie for that week. The movie was watched by 1.72 million viewers. Following one season of the TV series, Hallmark announced Signed, Sealed, Delivered would transition to a series of television films on its Hallmark Movies & Mysteries channel.

Cast

Main
 Eric Mabius as Oliver O'Toole
 Kristin Booth as Shane McInerney
 Crystal Lowe as Rita Haywith-Dorman
 Geoff Gustafson as Norman Xavier Dorman

Guest stars
 Valerie Bertinelli as Rebecca Starkwell
 Carol Burnett as Ardis Paine, Norman's grandmother
 Valerie Harper as Theresa Capodiamonte
 Marilu Henner as Glynis Rucker
 Della Reese as Cora Brandt

Critical reception
Varietys Brian Lowry commented that it was "so old fashioned and hokey that it just might work." David Hinckley of New York Daily News gave it 3 stars out of 5 in 2014 and said that while all the characters were terribly likable, they spoke as if they were reading from Hallmark greeting cards.

Signed, Sealed, Delivered scored 58 out of 100 on Metacritic based on five "mixed or average" reviews.

Episodes

Made-for-TV films

Characters
 A dark grey cell indicates the character was not in the film.

References

External links
 Official Signed, Sealed, Delivered website
 

2010s American comedy-drama television series
2014 American television series debuts
2014 American television series endings
2010s Canadian comedy-drama television series
2014 Canadian television series debuts
2014 Canadian television series endings
English-language television shows
Hallmark Channel original programming
Hallmark Channel original films
Television series by Muse Entertainment
Television shows set in Nevada
Television shows filmed in Vancouver
United States Postal Service in fiction